The Daily Dose Cafe was an organic cafe and espresso bar in downtown's Arts District in Los Angeles, California, United States, known for its farm-to-table style of cooking known as California cuisine. Sarkis Vartanian opened the cafe in 2012, serving organically produced food, artisan coffees, and home made baked goods. The cafe takes part in the slow food movement.

Historic landmark

The Alley 
The cobblestone-lined alley in the Los Angeles Arts District sits in between turn-of-the-century industrial buildings and bow-truss brick structures.

This alley used to function as an interchange track within a series of switching track plans in the railroad yard known as "The Patch". It is the oldest switching district in Los Angeles served by the Santa Fe Railroad. The buildings were served by a patchwork of tracks down streets and alleys. Trains terminating in Los Angeles arrived at Atchison, Topeka and Santa Fe Railway Le Grande Station on the corner of 2nd and Santa Fe.

The Patch 
The Patch (including industries between Fifth and Sacramento Streets and the "Market" on Alameda Street) played a role in the Los Angeles railway system served by the Santa Fe Railroad. 

The origin of the nickname "Patch" is unknown. Some theories say refers to the lamps on switches, glowing red and green in the night, reminiscent of a patch of strawberries or green vegetables. The area was industrialized in the 1880s, and the name could refer to the garden patches that existed prior to industrialization.

The curved brick building where the Daily Dose Cafe is located belongs to the District #22 called "Canal".

Historical significance 

Because the Santa Fe Railroad included multiple industry railroad tracks into the terminal, and a small crew of switch-men could have the cars reset for departure to their respective industry, it created the connection for merchants between the East and West Coasts, fueling rapid urban development in Los Angeles of new economic growth and whole markets circa 1918. Shipping fostered cultural epicenters in Los Angeles, Chicago, and New York. These structures originally served by the Santa Fe Railroad and AT&SF nearly a century ago received freight train cars arriving and departing with goods and services, such as produce from a network of Californian farms, railroad mail express, and tourism.

Structures that were once goods sheds, engine rooms, and warehouses in the yard are now inhabited by Daily Dose Cafe, the Bread Lounge, Hauser Wirth & Schimmel, Angel Brewery, Southern California Institute of Architecture, and One Santa Fe, and previously American Apparel's headquarters.

Cuisine

Farm-to-table 

Serving seasonal dishes, the Daily Dose sourced the ingredients that are locally grown and harvested by regional farms, farmer's markets, and bakeries. The menu changes were determined by what is fresh and in season. Vartaian, the owner, obtains produce from the South Pasadena, Echo Park, and Atwater Village farmer's markets. He acquires deli meats from Fra'mani, an Italian restaurant owned by Paul Bertolli, who co-founded Chez Panisse with Alice Waters. Waters and Bertolli were pioneers in the farm-to-table movement of the United States in Berkeley, California during the 1960s.

The Vartanian Ranch 
Tomatoes, herbs, fruits, and eggs from ducks, geese, and chickens come from the Vartanian Ranch, an eight-acre farm in Temecula, California.

Aeroponic gardens 
The farm uses 60 vertical hydroponic tower systems manufactured by Future Growing. These columns of aeroponic gardens growing herbs and vegetable are pesticide-free, organic, and harvest enough to feed 80 people for 10 months out of the year. The white, food-grade plastic towers are stacked on 25-gallon reservoirs.

Mission and mascot 
The Daily Dose believes that "every human has the right to organic good healthy food", says Sarkis Vartaian about embracing localism and the adopting the farmer's methods of "bringing conscious healthy food that are brilliant for the body for an affordable price."

Inspired by the working person, the cuisine menu is named after the Butcher, the Tailor, Mike the Mechanic, and the Farmer. Daily Dose features a monkey named Mike D. "Mike D the Monkey represents the average working man - "Monkey in a Suit" who are like us - 'Food For Us by Us' ", explains Vartaian.

Notable collaborations/community events 
Local emerging chefs and community organizations are in constant collaboration with the Daily Dose, hosting events with the goal in "bringing fresh food to an area, where it isn’t available". A lunch program in partnership with American Apparel, whose Downtown Los Angeles headquarters was also located in the Southern Pacific Railroad Station in the heavy industrial area on Alameda Street, provided about 5,000 textile manufacturers and immigrant workers with local, nutritional lunches.

An American Apparel lunch program called Room Service, Kitchen Table Thanksgiving, Devon's Table Oktoberfest, and Esotouric tours are some many community-based events hosted at the cafe.

Culinary influences
On a walking expedition in the European countryside, Sarkis Vartanian encountered the slow food movement in Italy, a local community who encourage the use of regional produce and traditional foods, grown organically and in the company of others, and teach the importance of defending agricultural biodiversity. Back in Los Angeles, Vartanian pursued his passion to make organic produce more accessible by advocating an urban industrial farm and cafe with outdoor seating on the railroad tracks of Industrial Street.

The Daily Dose Cafe is a modern proponent of the California cuisine style, emphasizing vegetables and foraged foods while maintaining the traditional emphasis on local foods and presentation. Some believe that through the Daily Dose, Vartanian has advanced the reach of the slow food movement culture to the urban environment of Southern California, transforming a heavily industrial landscape in the Arts District neighborhood.

Filming
The Daily Dose Cafe has been featured in photoshoots, television series, student films, and movies:

 Vogue photo editorial with Skater Girl Sierra Prescott was shot at the Daily Dose.
Rizzoli & Isles, Season 6, episode "Scared to Death" - Daily Dose Cafe played the role of a Boston cafe.
CSI: Cyber, Season 1, episode "Firecord", 2015, the Daily Dose Cafe played the role of a Washington D.C. cafe.
Revenge, Season 3, in 2 episodes in 2014 the exterior of the cafe was featured.
Scandal, episode "Dog-Whistle Politics", Daily Dose Café stood in for the Café Graisseux in Paris.

References

External links

2012 establishments in California
Adaptive reuse of industrial structures in Greater Los Angeles
Cuisine of the Western United States
Los Angeles Historic-Cultural Monuments
Los Angeles Railway
Restaurants established in 2012
Restaurants in Los Angeles